Innu is the second album by Canadian folk rock band Kashtin, released in 1991. The album was certified platinum in Canada, and was a shortlisted Juno Award nominee for the Best World Beat Recording and Best Roots and Traditional Album awards at the Juno Awards of 1992.

It contains the band's biggest chart hit, "Ishkuess", as well as a cover of Willie Dunn's "Son of the Sun", the only song the band ever recorded in a language other than their native Innu tongue.

Track listing
 Overture
 Nikanish (My People)
 Nekashtuamani
 Nte Tshitshuat (Your Place)
 Apu Tshekuan Nikan'kuian
 Harricana
 Son of the Sun
 Tshinuau
 Apu Min'tan
 Uishama
 Ishkuess

References

1991 albums
Kashtin albums